Saint-Jean-le-Comtal is a commune in the Gers department in southwestern France.

Geography

Population

See also
Communes of the Gers department

References

External links
Saint-Jean-le-Comtal on the website of the Communauté de Communes Val de Gers

Communes of Gers